Kazimierz Rutkowski DFC (24 May 19143 May 1995) was a Polish fighter ace of the Polish Air Force in World War II with 5 confirmed kills and one shared.

Biography
Kazimierz Rutkowski was born in Liszno near Lublin. In 1938 he was graduated from the Polish Air Force Academy in Dęblin and assigned to the Polish 132nd Fighter Escadrille in Poznań. During the August 1939 mobilization he was posted to the Polish 36th Observation Escadrille where he flew Lublin R-XIII planes. On 9 September he was hit and crash-landed.

After the Invasion of Poland Rutkowski arrived in the UK, since 4 September 1940 he served in the No. 306 Polish Fighter Squadron. On 19 May 1941 he was wounded. After Rutkowski returned to health he was ordered to the No. 317 Polish Fighter Squadron. On 18 December 1941 he shot down his first plane. From 23 August 1942 to 17 March 1943 he was commander of the No. 306 Squadron. On 11 May 1944 he volunteered to join the USAAF 61st Fighter Squadron where he flew P-47. From 11 October 1944 to 30 January 1945 Rutkowski was commander of the 3rd Polish Fighter Wing. He was also the commander of the No. 133 Wing RAF.

Kazimierz Rutkowski died on 3 May 1995 in San Diego.

Aerial victory credits
 Bf 109 – 16 June 1941 (damaged)
 Bf 109 – 18 December 1941  
 Bf 109 – 30 December 1941 
 He 111 – 19 August 1942 
 Do 217 – 19 August 1942 
 Fw 190 – 21 January 1943 (probably destroyed)
 Fw 190 – 15 February 1943 
 1/2 Bf 109 – 18 October 1944 
 Fw 190 – 7 December 1944 (probably destroyed)

Awards
 Virtuti Militari, Silver Cross 
 Cross of Valour (Poland), three times
 Distinguished Flying Cross (United Kingdom)
 Victory Medal (United Kingdom)

References

Further reading
 Tadeusz Jerzy Krzystek, Anna Krzystek: Polskie Siły Powietrzne w Wielkiej Brytanii w latach 1940-1947 łącznie z Pomocniczą Lotniczą Służbą Kobiet (PLSK-WAAF). Sandomierz: Stratus, 2012, s. 496. 
 Jerzy Pawlak: Absolwenci Szkoły Orląt: 1925-1939. Warszawa: Retro-Art, 2009, s. 187. 
 Piotr Sikora: Asy polskiego lotnictwa. Warszawa: Oficyna Wydawnicza Alma-Press. 2014, s. 317-321. 
 Józef Zieliński: Asy polskiego lotnictwa. Warszawa: Agencja lotnicza ALTAIR, 1994, s. 58. ISBN 83862172.

External links
 
 

The Few
Polish World War II flying aces
Recipients of the Silver Cross of the Virtuti Militari
Recipients of the Cross of Valour (Poland)
1995 deaths
1914 births
Polish emigrants to the United States